The 2011–12 Russian Cup, known as the 2011–12 Pirelli–Russian Football Cup for sponsorship reasons, was the twentieth season of the Russian football knockout tournament since the dissolution of Soviet Union. The competition started on April 20, 2011 and  finished with the final held in May 2012. The cup champion wins a spot in the 2012–13 UEFA Europa League group stage.

First round
This round featured 6 Second Division teams. The game was played April 22 and April 30, 2011.

Section South

Section East

Second round
In this round entered 3 winner from the First Round, 48 Second Division teams and 3 amateur teams. The matches were played from April 22 to May 11, 2011.

Section West

Section Center

Section East

Section South

Section Ural-Povolzhye

Third round

In this round entered 27 winners from the Second Round and the remaining 21 Second Division teams. The matches were played from May 10 to May 23, 2011.

Section West

Section Center

Section South

Section Ural-Povolzhye

Section East

Fourth round
In this round entered 24 winners the Third round. The matches were played from June 4 to June 16, 2011.

Section West

Section Center

Section South

Section Ural-Povolzhye

Section East

Fifth round
The 12 winners from the Fourth Round and the 20 FNL teams entered this round. The matches were played on July 4–5, 2011.

|}

Round of 32
The 16 winners from the Fifth Round hosted the Russian Premier League teams in this round. The matches were played on July 17, 2011.

Round of 16
In this round the 16 winners from the Round of 32 round enter. The matches was played on September 20 and 21, 2011.

Quarter-finals

Note: Rubin played their home game in Grozny due to bad pitch conditions in Kazan.

Semi-finals

Final

Played in the earlier stages, but were not on the final game squad:

FC Dynamo Moscow:  Marko Lomić (DF),  Luke Wilkshire (DF), Andrei Karyaka (MF),  Artur Yusupov (MF).

FC Rubin Kazan:  Solomon Kvirkvelia (DF),  Jonatan Valle (MF), Alisher Dzhalilov (MF),  Aleksei Eremenko (MF), Alan Kasaev (MF),  Syarhey Kislyak (MF), Ruslan Makhmutov (MF),  Christian Noboa (MF),  Alexandru Antoniuc (FW),  Igor Lebedenko (FW),  Obafemi Martins (FW), Aleksei Medvedev (FW).

References

External links
 Official page 

Russian Cup seasons
Cup
Russian Cup